Buffalo Memorial Auditorium, colloquially known as The Aud, was a multipurpose indoor arena in downtown Buffalo, New York. Opened on October 14, 1940, it was home to the Canisius Golden Griffins (NCAA), the Buffalo Bisons (AHL), the Buffalo Bisons (NBL), the Buffalo Braves (NBA), the Buffalo Sabres (NHL), the Toronto-Buffalo Royals (WTT), the Buffalo Stallions (MSL), the Buffalo Bandits (MILL), the Buffalo Blizzard (NPSL) and the Buffalo Stampede (RHI). It also hosted events such as college basketball, concerts, professional wrestling and boxing. The venue was closed in 1996 after the construction of the venue now known as KeyBank Center, and remained vacant until being demolished in 2009.

History

Planning and construction
The Buffalo Memorial Auditorium was a public works project designed by Green & James to replace the aging Broadway Auditorium and Fort Erie's recently collapsed Peace Bridge Arena. In June 1938, city officials sent a loan and grant application to the Works Progress Administration for funds to build the structure. The approval of the $1.2 million grant was announced in Washington, D.C. on October 7, 1938. Construction at the junction of the Erie Canal and Main-Hamburg Canal began on November 30, 1939.

The Auditorium's construction brought a great deal of activity to downtown Buffalo. On December 31, 1939, Buffalo Evening News reporter Nat Gorham wrote:

Opening and reception

Built for $2.7 million, Memorial Auditorium's grand opening celebration took place on October 14, 1940. The dedication event was a luncheon attended by 3,000 people, including the mayors of more than 60 local communities. The building was dedicated as a war memorial to those who had perished in World War I. The arena originally seated 12,280 for ice hockey, with an additional 2,000-3,000 seats in the floor area for basketball and other events. Memorial Auditorium's first event—a rally for Republican Presidential candidate Wendell Willkie—took place on October 14, 1940. In its first seven months, events such as auto shows, roller skating, circuses and dog shows drew nearly one million spectators. All told, the Auditorium's first year attendance was 1.3 million.

Alterations

An $8.7 million renovation took place after the 1970–71 inauguration of the Sabres and Braves franchises, making it a more suitable home for the NHL and NBA. The arena's roof was raised  to make room for an upper level that increased the arena's capacity from 10,449 for hockey to over 17,000 for basketball and 15,360 for hockey in 1971–72, to 15,668 for hockey in 1972–73, and to 15,858 for hockey in 1973–74.

Other changes to the Aud's original design included:

 A new scoreboard, which would be the Aud's final scoreboard upgrade. 
 A new upper level with stairways, escalators and upper exits. 
 Repainted and replaced seats. The original gray seats at the top of the lower bowl were painted blue, and all seats in the lower sections were replaced with cushioned seats in the Red and Gold sections.
 The removal of exit tunnels in Red sections 6, 7, 14, 15, 22, 23, 30 and 31, and Blue sections 2, 3, 10, 11, 18, 19, 26, 27, 34 and 35. The areas the tunnels occupied were replaced with seats, and the continuous wall that separated the red and blue sections was opened at each stairway. 
 The removed exit tunnel openings in the wall that separated the red and upper gold sections were closed into a continuous wall between the remaining red exit tunnels.

The Aud's seats were mostly made of white ash, but the gold seats were converted to padded cushion seats. From top to bottom (floor level), the seating colors went orange, blue (originally grey), red and gold.

In 1974, the city added five seats, increasing capacity for hockey in the 1974–1975 season to 15,863. After the hockey season, the city removed the walls and aisle that separated the upper gold and red seating sections. The 570 gold seats the city installed in the vacant space raised the arena's capacity to 16,433 for hockey and over 18,000 for basketball.

In the late 1980s, the Buffalo Common Council and mayor James D. Griffin scaled back plans to renovate the Aud after the Sabres' owners made it clear the franchise's long-term viability depended upon a new arena. A compromise led the city to agree to build a new venue (Marine Midland Arena) and keep the Aud functional until the new arena was complete. The 1990 renovation added designated handicap-accessible seating areas (lowering the seating capacity to 16,325 for hockey), new air conditioning and elevators. The money the city borrowed for these improvements was not repaid until 2001, five years after the Aud closed.

Closing and vacancy

The Aud closed in 1996, at which time the Sabres, Bandits and Blizzard moved to Marine Midland Arena. After 1996, the building remained vacant, although members of Studio Arena Theatre used the floor as a surface for painting backgrounds. During the 2001–02 season, Sabres officials and the city moved items from the Aud's main concourse to the new venue, by then renamed HSBC Arena, including a sign for the "Pour Man's Aud Club" which was reincarnated at the new venue.

In 2003, the Sabres filmed a 30-minute infomercial inside the Aud to promote season ticket sales. While the production showed the arena was intact, it was without utilities and the crew had to supply all light and electrical sources.

The Aud continued to deteriorate after the 2003 production visit. Water pipes ruptured, moisture began to take its toll and the city's lax monitoring led to graffiti, vandalism and theft of many artifacts. A segment aired during the CBC Television Hockey Night in Canada broadcast of the 2008 NHL Winter Classic showed the arena's seating bowl and floor were virtually untouched. Notably, the advertisements on the boards from the final Sabres game in 1996 against the Hartford Whalers and the scoreboard above center ice remained. The door to the Sabres' penalty box was gone, as it had been presented as a memento to notable Sabres enforcer Rob Ray.

Demolition

The city abandoned its plans to repurpose the Aud as a Bass Pro Shops store on March 29, 2007 when Bass Pro announced it would construct a new building on the site after the auditorium's demolition.

In December 2007, the city sold the Aud to the Erie Canal Harbor Development Corporation for $1 in hopes it would lead to asbestos removal and demolition. All salvageable items were to be removed and sold or stored. The sales of these artifacts, especially of seats, would help pay for a memorial to the Aud. The salvaged items include art deco flag holders, limestone eagles, a time capsule as well as a number of blue and orange level seats, which were sold at auction.

The city also salvaged ten cylindrical stainless steel "ice tanks" that helped maintain chilly conditions at ice level during hockey season and cooled spectators during warmer weather. In 2007, the city moved them to Shea's Performing Arts Center as part of a $1.5 million overhaul of the landmark theater's heating and cooling system.

Asbestos removal and other environmental remediation took place in late 2008 and the expected $10 million demolition of the Aud began in January 2009. On February 9, 2009, the "Buffalo Memorial Auditorium" entablature above the main entrance fell and much of the front façade met the same fate soon afterward. The "Farewell Buffalo Memorial Auditorium Ceremony" took place on June 30, 2009 at 1:30 pm when officials opened the copper box time capsule. The structure's final pieces came down in early July 2009.

In February 2010, Bass Pro Shops announced that it was no longer pursuing a store in Buffalo, leaving the site vacant.

Legacy

After the Bass Pro Shops decision, the Erie Canal Harbor Development Corporation began to convert the site (known as the Aud Block) into an extension of Canalside with the junction of the old Erie Canal and Main-Hamburg Canal re-dug (although shallower than the original canals) and new bridges. The canals that opened in 2014 are frozen for skating and other winter activities by an underground refrigerant plant housed in a rebuilt sub-basement that was part of Memorial Auditorium. In addition, a marker on the canal ice denotes center ice's former location.

Across Main Street at LECOM Harborcenter is the one-of-a-kind Tim Hortons restaurant with a memorial to the Auditorium. A statue of the chain's founder and namesake, who played at the arena during his time with the Buffalo Sabres, occupies the corner of the site facing the restaurant.

Notable events

Basketball

College

Before the National Basketball Association and National Hockey League came to Buffalo, college basketball was Memorial Auditorium's most popular sporting event. On December 11, 1940, the Auditorium hosted its first college basketball game when Canisius College played the University of Oregon. Interest in college basketball grew after World War II, and the first college basketball sellout crowd occurred in the 1946–1947 season when 11,029 spectators saw Canisius lose to Notre Dame. Ten days later, a record 11,891 watched Canisius defeat Niagara 52–44.

While the teams were typically from Western New York, including Canisius, Niagara University, St. Bonaventure University, the University at Buffalo and Buffalo State College, other teams such as Cornell University took part. Over time, the rivalry among the "Little Three" colleges—Niagara, Canisius, and St. Bonaventure—came to dominate the Auditorium's college basketball schedule. Throughout the 1950s, the three schools were all national powers, and their games at Memorial Auditorium drew strong local and national interest.

 The Aud hosted first round games of the 1954 NCAA basketball tournament.
 The Auditorium hosted the mens Division I ECAC Upstate Region tournament organized by the Eastern College Athletic Conference (ECAC) in 1975.
 In 1991, a visit from Buffalo native Christian Laettner and the national champion Duke University Blue Devils against Canisius drew an Aud collegiate-record crowd of 16,279.
 A 1996 Buffalo News article named Memorial Auditorium's all-time all-visitors team: Ed Macauley (Saint Louis University), Tom Gola (La Salle University), Tom Heinsohn (College of the Holy Cross), Jerry West (West Virginia University), Willie Somerset (Duquesne University), Dave Bing (Syracuse University), Sonny Dove (St. John's University) and Bob Lanier (St. Bonaventure University).

National Basketball League
The National Basketball League's Buffalo Bisons were the first professional basketball franchise to call Memorial Auditorium home. The team featured center Don Otten and coach Nat Hickey, but on December 27, 1946—only 13 games into their inaugural season—owner Ben Kerner moved them to Moline, Illinois. After the 1949 merger of the National Basketball League and the Basketball Association of America and stops in Milwaukee and St. Louis, the team became the Atlanta Hawks.

National Basketball Association

Professional basketball returned to the Aud in 1970 with the National Basketball Association's Buffalo Braves. The Braves were a modest success but often found the competing interests of the Sabres and the Little Three college teams made it difficult to schedule home games. The Braves moved to San Diego in 1978 and then to Los Angeles in 1984, where they are now the Los Angeles Clippers.

The NBA retained a presence at the venue by staging an annual series of preseason exhibitions called the NBA Classic:

 The Los Angeles Lakers defeated the New Jersey Nets 105–93 on October 24, 1988
 The New York Knicks defeated the Cleveland Cavaliers 96–93 on October 14, 1989
 The Chicago Bulls defeated the Miami Heat 115–107 on October 26, 1989
 The Boston Celtics defeated Washington Bullets 104–96 on October 26, 1990
 The Chicago Bulls defeated the Sacramento Kings 105–96 on October 27, 1992
 The New York Knicks defeated the Denver Nuggets 100–98 on October 17, 1995

World University Games
The basketball events of the World University Games were held at the venue in July 1993. The United States defeated Canada in the gold medal game 95–90 before a crowd of 11,000.

Hockey

American Hockey League
The American Hockey League's Buffalo Bisons played 30 seasons at the Memorial Auditorium, beginning with the 1940–41 season. The Bisons won five Calder Cup championships, with the last coming in 1970 during the franchise's final game. The team folded in 1970 after the National Hockey League awarded Buffalo an expansion team.

On May 15, 1973, the Cincinnati Swords, then the Sabres' AHL affiliate, played the final game of the 1973 Calder Cup Finals at the Auditorium. The Swords won the Calder Cup with a 5–1 win over the Nova Scotia Voyageurs in front of 15,019 fans—the largest playoff crowd in AHL history at the time. The Rochester Americans also played several games at the Aud after they became the Sabres' affiliate, including several during their 1987 Calder Cup championship season.

National Hockey League

The Buffalo Sabres made their Memorial Auditorium debut on October 15, 1970 in a game attended by NHL President Clarence Campbell that began with a ceremonial faceoff between Sabres captain Floyd Smith and Montreal Canadiens captain Jean Béliveau. The Sabres' Roger Crozier made 53 saves in a 3–0 loss.

The arena hosted games three, four, and six of the 1975 Stanley Cup Finals, where the Sabres faced the Philadelphia Flyers. Eventually, the Flyers would win their second consecutive Stanley Cup championship in game six at the arena. This was the only Stanley Cup Finals appearance made at the Auditorium.

On January 4, 1976, the Sabres played Krylya Sovetov as part of the "Super Series" of exhibitions between the Soviet Union's two best club teams—CSKA Moscow and Krylia Sovietov (named "Red Army" and "Soviet Wings" respectively, during the series) and eight of the NHL's top teams. The Sabres' 12–6 victory over the 1974 Soviet league and European Cup champions was the worst defeat ever for a professional Soviet hockey club.

Memorial Auditorium hosted the NHL All-Star Game on January 24, 1978. Two members of the Sabres' "French Connection" line—Gilbert Perreault and Rick Martin—played for the Wales Conference. Both had a significant impact: Martin scored a goal with 1:39 remaining in regulation to tie the game at 2–2 and force overtime, and Perreault scored the game-winning goal 3:55 into overtime to defeat the Campbell Conference 3–2.

The Edmonton Oilers' Wayne Gretzky made NHL history at the Aud on February 24, 1982, when he scored a natural hat trick during the game's final seven minutes to help defeat the Sabres 6–3. Gretzky broke Phil Esposito's record for goals in a season (76) with the hat trick's first goal, his 77th of the season. In March 2009, Gretzky visited Buffalo as the Phoenix Coyotes' head coach and recounted his memories of Memorial Auditorium in an interview with Buffalo News hockey reporter Mike Harrington:

The venue hosted the 1991 NHL Entry Draft, notable for Eric Lindros being selected first overall by the Quebec Nordiques and refusing to sign with the team.

The Sabres occupied the Auditorium through the 1995–96 season, when they moved to nearby Marine Midland Arena, now known as KeyBank Center. Michael Peca scored the last in-game goal at the Aud while Pat LaFontaine put in a ceremonial goal after the 4–1 win over the Hartford Whalers. It was the last arena where the ice sheet fell short of the league-mandated  by  size (though Maple Leaf Gardens had irregularly shaped corners).

College
College hockey made its modern debut at Memorial Auditorium on January 23, 1972, when the University at Buffalo Bulls met the Central Collegiate Hockey Association's Ohio State University. Ohio State won the game 5–2.

Roller Hockey International
Roller Hockey International's Buffalo Stampede called the Aud home from 1994–1995, winning the league championship in their first season.

Lacrosse

Major Indoor Lacrosse League
The Buffalo Bandits of Major Indoor Lacrosse League played in the Aud from the 1992 season until the arena's closure. Winners of the MILL title in 1992, 1993, and 1996, the Bandits are now a member of the National Lacrosse League and play at KeyBank Center.

Soccer

Major Soccer League
Major Soccer League's Buffalo Stallions attracted 11,028 to their home debut at the Aud against the Philadelphia Fever on December 7, 1979. The team played in the venue until 1984. Soccer legend Eusébio notably finished his career playing for the Stallions in their inaugural season.

National Professional Soccer League
The Aud was home to the Buffalo Blizzard of the National Professional Soccer League from 1992 to 1996.

Tennis

World Team Tennis
In 1974, the Toronto-Buffalo Royals of World Team Tennis called the Aud home for one season.

Figure skating

Ice Capades

The Aud was one of the original venues that hosted Ice Capades in 1940.

Ice Follies

Ice Follies made its debut at the venue in 1941, and continued making regular stops after becoming Disney on Ice in 1981.

SABAH

The annual pageant to benefit the Skating Association for the Blind and Handicapped (SABAH) was staged at the venue from 1979 to 1996.

Torvill and Dean

Torvill and Dean, famed Olympic ice dancers, brought their touring show to the Aud on November 8, 1986.

Skate America

The venue was host to the 1990 Skate America competition.

Stars on Ice

Stars on Ice began making regular stops at the venue beginning in 1991.

Combat sports

Professional wrestling

The first sporting event at the venue was a Great Lakes Athletic Club professional wrestling card on October 18, 1940 that was headlined by Ed Don George defeating Joe Savoldi.  Great Lakes Athletic Club owner Jack Herman continued booking shows at the venue before selling the promotion in 1947 to Ed Don George, who changed the promotion's name to Upstate Athletic Club. WBEN-TV would regularly broadcast Upstate Athletic Club's cards from the venue in 1948. Don George would later sell the promotion to his matchmaker, Ignacio "Pedro" Martinez, in 1955. Ilio DiPaolo, the son-in-law of Martinez, was the promotion's biggest star. WGR-TV broadcast Upstate Athletic Club's cards from the venue in 1956 as Wrestling from War Memorial Auditorium. Martinez would continue booking shows at The Aud until 1968, when he ran into financial trouble and was forced to promote outside the area. He returned in 1970 with his National Wrestling Federation, but the promotion folded in 1974.

Jim Crockett Promotions debuted at the venue on July 19, 1980 with a show headlined by Ric Flair and Sweet Ebony Diamond defeating Greg Valentine and The Iron Sheik.

The Honky Tonk Man defeated Ricky Steamboat to win the WWF Intercontinental Championship during a WWF Superstars of Wrestling taping at the venue on June 2, 1987.

The inaugural Ilio DiPaolo Memorial Show was held at the venue on June 7, 1996 and was headlined by The Giant defeating Sting to retain the WCW World Heavyweight Championship. DiPaolo had died the previous year after being struck by a car. It was the final sporting event at the venue, and set the venue's all-time record for professional wrestling attendance with 14,852.

Boxing

The auditorium hosted many boxing matches, most notably:

 Ezzard Charles defeating Freddie Beshore to retain the NBA Heavyweight Title on August 15, 1950.
 Gene Hatcher defeating Johnny Bumphus to win the WBA Junior Welterweight Title on June 1, 1984. (The Ring magazine Upset of the Year) 
 Livingstone Bramble defeating Ray Mancini to win the WBA Lightweight Title on June 1, 1984.
 Héctor Camacho defeating Roque Montoya to win the vacant NABF Lightweight Title on April 29, 1985.
 Tony Tubbs defeating Greg Page to win the WBA Heavyweight Title on April 29, 1985.

Mixed martial arts
UFC 7: The Brawl in Buffalo was held at the Aud on September 8, 1995. It would be the final UFC event in the state before mixed martial arts was banned by New York State in February 1997. UFC would not return to New York State until UFC 205 in 2016.

Concerts

In addition to sporting events, the auditorium hosted concerts by many famous artists:

 Elvis Presley – April 1, 1957
 The Rolling Stones (American Tour 1966) – June 28, 1966
 Elvis Presley - April 5, 1972
 Led Zeppelin (North American Tour 1972) – June 10, 1972
 Pink Floyd (Dark Side of the Moon Tour) – June 22, 1973
 Led Zeppelin (North American Tour 1973) – July 15, 1973
 Frank Sinatra – October 4, 1974 (released as the album The Main Event – Live)
 David Bowie (Diamond Dogs Tour) – November 8, 1974
 Yes (Relayer Tour) – November 21, 1974
 The Rolling Stones (Tour of the Americas '75) – June 15, 1975
 The Who (The Who by Numbers Tour) – December 10, 1975
 David Bowie (Isolar – 1976 Tour) – March 19, 1976
 Elvis Presley April 25, 1976
 Aerosmith Rocks Tour]]) – July 23, 1976
 Lynyrd Skynyrd (One More from the Road Tour) – October 29, 1976
 Kiss (Rock & Roll Over Tour) – December 15, 1976
 Genesis (Wind & Wuthering Tour) – February 28, 1977
 Grateful Dead – May 9, 1977 (released as the Grammy-nominated album May 1977: Get Shown the Light)
 Crosby, Stills & Nash (Reunion Tour) – June 10, 1977
 Fleetwood Mac (Rumours Tour) – July 2, 1977
 Rod Stewart (Foot Loose & Fancy Free Tour) – October 17, 1977
 Kiss (Alive II Tour) – January 25, 1978
 Genesis (…And Then There Were Three… Tour) – March 29, 1978
 Crosby, Stills & Nash (Reunion Tour) – July 16, 1978
 Bob Dylan (World Tour 1978) – October 9, 1978
 Aerosmith (Live Bootleg! Tour) – September 27, 1978
 Yes (Tormato Tour) – August 29, 1978
 Jethro Tull (Heavy Horses Tour) – October 16, 1978
 Queen (Jazz Tour) – November 28, 1978
 Kiss (Dynasty Tour) – August 8, 1979
 Bee Gees (Spirits Having Flown Tour) – September 14, 1979
 The Jacksons (Destiny World Tour) – October 22, 1979
 Grateful Dead – November 9, 1979 (released as the album Road Trips Volume 1 Number 1)
 The Who (The Who Tour 1979) – December 4, 1979 (dedicated to the victims of The Who concert disaster)
 ZZ Top (Expect No Quarter Tour) – April 1, 1980
 Rick James (Fire It Up Tour) – April 2, 1980
 Fleetwood Mac (Tusk Tour) – May 19, 1980
 
 Journey (Departure Tour) – August 14, 1980
 Ted Nugent – September 3, 1980 (released as the album Intensities in 10 Cities)
 Yes (Drama Tour) – September 17, 1980
 Black Sabbath (Heaven & Hell Tour) – October 13, 1980
 Frank Zappa – October 25, 1980 (released as the album Buffalo)
 Bruce Springsteen (The River Tour) – December 4, 1980
 Rush – May 9, 1981 (the cover of the album Exit... Stage Left was photographed at this show)
 ZZ Top (El Loco-Motion Tour) – June 27, 1981
 The Jacksons (Triumph Tour) – August 2, 1981
 Electric Light Orchestra (Time Tour) – October 10, 1981
 Black Sabbath (Mob Rules Tour) – December 1, 1981
 Ozzy Osbourne (Diary of a Madman Tour) – April 9, 1982
 Journey (Escape Tour) – May 1, 1982
 Scorpions (Blackout Tour) – June 22, 1982
 Iron Maiden (The Beast on the Road) – July 3, 1982
 Olivia Newton-John (Physical Tour) – September 14, 1982
 Judas Priest (World Vengeance Tour) – October 15, 1982
 Jefferson Starship (Winds of Change Tour) - November 2, 1982
 Phil Collins (The Hello, I Must Be Going Tour) – February 10, 1983
 Prince (1999 Tour) – February 24, 1983
 Journey (Frontiers Tour) – May 22, 1983
 ZZ Top (Eliminator Tour) – July 31, 1983
 Iron Maiden (World Piece Tour) – August 15, 1983
 David Bowie (Serious Moonlight Tour) – September 5, 1983
 Stevie Ray Vaughan (Texas Flood Tour) – October 19, 1983
 Black Sabbath (Born Again Tour) – October 27, 1983
 Genesis (Mama Tour) – December 3, 1983
 Ozzy Osbourne (Bark at the Moon Tour) – January 28, 1984
 The Police (Synchronicity Tour) – February 22, 1984
 Van Halen (1984 Tour) – March 22, 1984
 Billy Joel (An Innocent Man Tour) – March 28, 1984
 Yes (9012Live Tour) – May 9, 1984
 Scorpions (Love at First Sting World Tour) – June 2, 1984
 Bruce Springsteen (Born in the U.S.A. Tour) – September 24, 1984 and September 25, 1984
 Prince (Purple Rain Tour) – December 17, 1984 and December 18, 1984
 Iron Maiden (World Slavery Tour) – January 7, 1985
 Roger Waters (The Pros and Cons of Hitch Hiking Tour)) – March 21, 1985

 Foreigner-May 10, 1985
 Robert Plant (The Shaken 'N' Stirred Tour) – July 19, 1985
 Mötley Crüe (Theatre of Pain Tour) – October 11, 1985
 Ratt (World Infestation Tour) – September 29, 1985
 Judas Priest (Fuel for Life Tour) – July 27, 1986
 David Lee Roth (Eat 'Em and Smile Tour) – September 30, 1986
 Neil Young & Crazy Horse- October 4, 1986
 Journey (Raised on Radio Tour) – October 18, 1986
 Ratt (Dancing Undercover World Tour) – January 3, 1987
 Bon Jovi (Slippery When Wet Tour) – March 28, 1987
 Iron Maiden (Somewhere on Tour) – April 10, 1987
 Roger Waters (Radio K.A.O.S. Tour) – August 20, 1987
 U2 (The Joshua Tree Tour) – October 7, 1987
 Aerosmith (Permanent Vacation Tour) – October 17, 1987
 Boston (Third Stage Tour) – October 31, 1987
 Mötley Crüe (Girls, Girls, Girls Tour) – August 2, 1987
 Yes (Big Generator Tour) – December 4, 1987
 Def Leppard (Hysteria Tour) - February 3, 1988
 Judas Priest (Mercenaries of Metal Tour) – August 11, 1988
 Ozzy Osbourne (No Rest for the Wicked Tour) – November 29, 1988
 Metallica (Damaged Justice Tour) - March 13, 1989
 Rod Stewart (Out of Order Tour) – June 16, 1989
 R.E.M. (Green Tour) – September 12, 1989
 Gloria Estefan (Get On Your Feet Tour) - November 24, 1989
 Mötley Crüe (Dr. Feelgood World Tour '89–'90) – December 19, 1989
 ZZ Top (Recycler Tour) – February 1, 1991
 Yes (Union Tour) – April 26, 1991
 Queensrÿche (Building Empires Tour) – June 8, 1991
 Whitney Houston (I'm Your Baby Tonight World Tour) – August 1, 1991
 Gloria Estefan (Into The Light Tour) - September 13, 1991
 Van Halen (For Unlawful Carnal Knowledge Tour) – October 20, 1991
 Paula Abdul (Under My Spell Tour) – November 24, 1991
 Metallica (Wherever We May Roam Tour) – December 3, 1991
 Ozzy Osbourne (No More Tours Tour) – November 5, 1992
 Bobby Brown (Humpin' Around the World Tour) – January 7, 1993
 Def Leppard (Adrenalize World Tour) – March 19, 1993
 Elton John (The One Tour) – April 25, 1993
 Garth Brooks (World Tour (1993–94)) – March 18, 1994 and March 19, 1994
 ZZ Top (Antenna World Tour) – May 28, 1994
 Nine Inch Nails (Self Destruct Tour) – November 29, 1994
 Rod Stewart (A Spanner in the Works Tour) – February 20, 1996
 AC/DC (Ballbreaker Tour) - August 3, 1996
 Gloria Estefan (Evolution Tour) - August 31, 1996

Special features

Tributes

The Buffalo Sabres retired the numbers of all three members of The French Connection – Gilbert Perreault (11) in 1990, René Robert (14) in 1995, and Rick Martin (7) in 1995. The number of Tim Horton (2) was retired in 1996. Banners for all four individuals were hung in the rafters of Memorial Auditorium, and later moved to the rafters of Marine Midland Arena after the venue closed.

Championship banners were hung at the venue for the Buffalo Sabres (1975, 1980 and 1981 Division Champions & 1975 and 1980 Prince of Wales Champions), Buffalo Bandits (1992 and 1993 World Champions), and the Buffalo Stampede (1994 World Champions). Banners were also hung to recognize postseason appearances by the Canisius Golden Griffins basketball team, and commemorating the venue hosting the 1993 World University Games . Only banners for the Sabres and Bandits were relocated to Marine Midland Arena after the venue's closure.

Eateries
At the time of its closing in 1996, the Aud's concessions included:

 The Aud Club, an upscale bar and restaurant with a private entrance that was also rented out for banquets and social functions. It was designed by Philip Amigone, the architect of the Chez Ami Supper Club.
 The Pour Man's Aud Club, an affordable eatery in the venue's lobby.

Delaware North handled all concessions for the venue through its Sportservice subsidiary. The company's founder, Louis Jacobs, was the original operating manager of Buffalo Memorial Auditorium.

Transportation access

The venue was served by Auditorium station of Buffalo Metro Rail, which still stands and now services both KeyBank Center and LECOM Harborcenter.

See also
War Memorial Stadium (Buffalo, New York)

References

External links

Buffalo Memorial Auditorium on BoxRec
Buffalo Memorial Auditorium on Urban Exploration Resource
Buffalo Memorial Auditorium on WrestlingData.com
Buffalo Memorial Aud - Abandoned at Roadwolf.ca (many photo albums)

1940 establishments in New York (state)
1940s architecture in the United States
1996 disestablishments in New York (state)
Basketball venues in New York (state)
Boxing venues in New York (state)
Buffalo Bandits arenas
Buffalo Bisons (AHL)
Buffalo Braves venues
Buildings and structures demolished in 2009
Buildings and structures in Buffalo, New York
Canisius Golden Griffins men's basketball
Defunct basketball venues in the United States
Defunct boxing venues in the United States
Defunct college ice hockey venues in the United States
Defunct indoor arenas in New York (state)
Defunct indoor lacrosse venues in the United States
Defunct indoor soccer venues in the United States
Defunct National Hockey League venues
Defunct sports venues in New York (state)
Demolished music venues in the United States
Demolished sports venues in New York (state)
Former music venues in New York (state)
Former National Basketball Association venues
Indoor ice hockey venues in New York (state)
Mixed martial arts venues in New York (state)
National Basketball League (United States) venues
Sports venues completed in 1940
Sports venues demolished in 2009
Sports venues in Buffalo, New York
Tennis venues in New York (state)
Works Progress Administration in New York (state)
World TeamTennis stadiums
Buffalo Sabres